The Cateys are a UK award ceremony for the hospitality industry, first held in 1984. They have been described as the hospitality industry's equivalent of the Oscars.
Recipients are nominated, selected and awarded by the industry through The Caterer magazine.

The Chef Award is one of the most coveted and previous winners include Paul Ainsworth in 2019, Claude Bosi in 2018, Tom Kerridge in 2017, Jason Atherton in 2012, Angela Hartnett in 2009, Heston Blumenthal in 2004, Gordon Ramsay in 2000, Brian Turner in 1997 and Raymond Blanc in 1990.

November 2007 saw the first spin-off event, The Hotel Cateys, which took place at the London Hilton on Park Lane, with Grant Hearn, CEO of Travelodge, taking the inaugural Outstanding Contribution to the Industry Award.

The Foodservice Cateys launched in 2013 at Park Plaza Westminster Bridge.

Winners

Chef Award

 2019 Paul Ainsworth
 2018 Claude Bosi
 2017 Tom Kerridge
 2016 Clare Smyth
 2015 Sat Bains
 2014 Andrew Fairlie
 2013 Simon Rogan
 2012 Jason Atherton
 2011 Brett Graham
 2010 Mark Hix
 2009 Angela Hartnett
 2008 John Campbell
 2007 David Everitt-Matthias
 2006 Bruce Poole
 2005 David Nicholls
 2004 Heston Blumenthal
 2003 Marcus Wareing
 2002 Germain Schwab 
 2001 Michael Caines
 2000 Gordon Ramsay
 1999 Rick Stein
 1998 Phil Howard
 1997 Brian Turner
 1996 Willi Elsener
 1995 John Burton Race
 1994 Michael Nadell
 1993 Shaun Hill
 1992 Bernard Gaume
 1991 Anton Edelmann
 1990 Raymond Blanc
 1989 Pierre Koffmann
 1988 Nico Ladenis
 1987 Peter Kromberg
 1986 Brian Cotterill
 1985 Anton Mosimann
 1984 Michel Bourdin

International Outstanding Achievement Award
 2019 Francis Mallman
 2018 Wolfgang Puck
 2017 Isador Sharp
 2016 Rene Redzepi
 2015 Daniel Boulud
 2014 Nobu Matsuhisa

Newcomer Award

 2021 Barge East, London
 2019 Salt, Stratford-upon-Avon
 2018 Smoke & Salt, London
 2017 Anglo, London
 2016 John and Kimberley Calton and James Laffan, the Staith House
 2015 House of Tides, Newcastle Quayside
 2014 Red’s True Barbecue
 2013 Ollie Dabbous
 2012 Russell Norman and Richard Beatty
 2011 Castle Terrace, Edinburgh
 2010 Texture Restaurant, London
 2009 The Nut Tree Inn, Murcott, Oxfordshire
 2008 The Kitchin, Edinburgh
 2007 The Hand & Flowers, Marlow
 2006 Galvin Bistrot de Luxe, London
 2005 Simon Rogan
 2004 Restaurant Tom Aikens
 2003 The Providores, London
 2002 Andrew Fairlie at Gleneagles
 2001 Brownes Brasserie and Townhouse,  Dublin
 2000 Coniston Hall Lodge
 1999 Club Gascon, London
 1998 The Star Inn, Harome
 1997 The Bank, London
 1996 Hotel du Vin & Bistro, Winchester
 1995 Gordon Ramsay
 1994 The Atrium, Edinburgh
 1993 Morston Hall, Morston
 1992 Paul Heathcote - MBE
 1991 Paul and Jeanne Rankin
 1990 Stuart Scher
 1989 Nick Wainford
 1988 David and Tina Thomson
 1987 Marco Pierre White
 1985 Rue St Jacques, London
 1984 Keith and Vanessa Gibbs

Menu of the Year

 2019 Inver
 2018 Xu
2017 The Ninth, London
2016 The Pointer, Brill, Buckinghamshire
2015 OX, Belfast
2014 Grain Store, London
2013 Sticky Walnut, Cheshire
2012 Quo Vadis (restaurant), London
2011 The Fox and Grapes, Wimbledon
2010 Corrigan's Mayfair
2009 The Harwood Arms, Fulham, London
2008 Scott's, London
2007 L'Atelier de Joël Robuchon
2006 The Albion, Clifton Village, Bristol
2005 Bohemia, St Helier, Jersey
2004 East@West, London
2003 Restaurant Sat Bains, Nottingham
2002 Bruno's, Dublin
2001 The Five Bells, Stanbridge
2000 Idaho, London
1999 The Glasshouse, Kew
1998 The River Station, Bristol
1997 The Star Inn, Harome
1996 The Canteen, London
1995 The Design House, Halifax
1994 Number Twenty Four, Wymondham
1993 The Box Tree, Ilkley
1992 Le Souffle, Hotel InterContinental,  London
1991 Calcot Manor, Tetbury
1990 Le Meridien, London
1989 Castle Hotel, Taunton
1988 Grand Hotel, Eastbourne
1987 Three Swans Hotel, Market Harborough
1986 Le Talbooth, Dedham
1985 The Savoy, London
1984 Waterside Inn, Bray

Hotel of the Year – Group

 2019 The Ned
 2018 Ham Yard Hotel
 2017 Rosewood London
 2016 Pennyhill Park Hotel, Bagshot, Surrey
 2015 The London Edition
 2014 Midland Hotel, Manchester
 2013 Hotel 41, London
 2012 Four Seasons Hotel London at Park Lane, London
 2011 Belmond Le Manoir aux Quat'Saisons, Great Milton, Oxfordshire
 2010 Cameron House on Loch Lomond
 2009 South Lodge, Lower Beeding, West Sussex
 2008 The Stafford, London
 2007 Malmaison Oxford
 2006 The Soho Hotel, London
 2005 City Inn Westminster
 2004 Thorpe Park Hotel & Spa, Leeds
 2003 Claridge's, London
 2002 Hilton London Metropole
 2001 Hotel du Vin, Bristol
 2000 The Berkeley, London
 1999 Travel Inn, County Hall, London
 1998 The Savoy, London
 1997 Malmaison, Edinburgh

Hotel of the Year – Independent

 2019 Rudding Park, Harrogate
 2018 The Torridon, Highlands of Scotland
 2017 The Beaumont, London
 2016 Longueville Manor, Jersey
 2015 Gravetye Manor, West Hoathly, West Sussex
 2014 The Atlantic Hotel, Jersey
 2013 The Pig, Brockenhurst, Hampshire
 2012 Gilpin Hotel & Lake House, Windermere
 2011 Feversham Arms Hotel & Verbena  Spa, Helmsley
 2010 Lucknam Park, Colerne, Wiltshire
 2009 The Goring Hotel, London
 2008 The Isle of Eriska Hotel
 2007 One Aldwych, London
 2006 The Chester Grosvenor Hotel and Spa
 2005 Cotswold House, Chipping Campden
 2004 Calcot Manor, Tetbury, Gloucestershire
 2003 The Vineyard Hotel at Stockcross, Berkshire
 2002 Ynyshir Hall, Machynlleth
 2001 Celtic Manor Resort, Newport
 2000 Chewton Glen, New Milton
 1999 Northcote Hotel, Langho
 1998 Crieff Hydro, Tayside
 1997 Gidleigh Park, Chagford

Manager of the Year

 2019 Sally Beck, Royal Lancaster London
 2018 Laura Sharpe, Ham Yard
 2017 Andrew Foulkes
 2016 Chantelle Nicholson
 2015 David Taylor
 2014 Peter Avis
 2013 Fred Sirieix
 2012 Justin Pinchbeck
 2011 Philip Newman-Hall
 2010 David Morgan-Hewitt

Lifetime Achievement Award

 2019 Shaun Hill
 2018 Diego Masciaga
 2017 Terence Conran
 2016 Bea Tollman
 2015 Nico Ladenis
 2014 William Baxter
 2013 Silvano Giraldin
 2012 Dick Turpin
 2011 Elena Salvoni
 2010 Roy Ackerman
 2009 Raymond Blanc
 2008 Harry Murray
 2007 Richard Sheppard
 2004 Anton Mossiman

Menu
Each year, a different top chef collaborates on the menu for the Cateys banquet. These include:
 2019 Lisa Goodwin-Allen 
 2018 Paul Cunningham
 2017 The Pig
 2016 Simon Rogan
 2015 Mark Sargeant
 2014 Gary Usher
 2013 Jason Atherton
 2012 Tom Kerridge
 2011 Chris & Jeff Galvin
 2010 Angela Hartnett
 2008 Marcus Wareing

References

External links
 The Cateys
 The Hotel Cateys
 The Caterer
 Article on the 2006 awards

Awards established in 1984
British awards
Hospitality industry awards
Hospitality industry in the United Kingdom
1984 establishments in the United Kingdom